FBXW7 neurodevelopmental syndrome is a newly discovered genetic disorder which is characterized by gastrointestinal, brain, and muscle anomalies accompanied by intellectual disabilities and developmental delays.

Signs and symptoms 

A study done in 2022 by Sarah E M Stephenson et al. found that nearly all patients with this condition had intellectual disabilities and developmental delays that ranged from borderline to severe, 62% of FBXW7 patients had hypotonia, 46% had feeding difficulties and regular constipation, and 23% of them had epilepsy. Brain imaging revealed anomalies in the structure of the cerebellum, the nervous fibres, and in the brain's white matter. Reduction of the gene associated with this condition in a fly model resulted in an intellectually impaired fly which didn't fly away when exposed to stimulus.

Causes 

This condition is associated with either nonsense/frameshift/splice-site/missense mutations or heterozygous deletions of the tumor suppressor FBXW7 gene, in chromosome 4. These mutations (most commonly the missense ones) were concentrated in the substrate binding surface of the WD40 domain, they (the mutations) are thought to reduce substrate binding balance.

Epidemiology 

This condition has been described in 35 individuals from 32 families in 7 countries worldwide.

The age of these people ranged from 2 years old to 44 years old.

History

This condition was first discovered in April 2022 by Sarah E M Stephenson et al., they gathered 35 people from across the world and analyzed their genome. It had its fair share of media coverage, being reported on medical websites from India, Australia, and the U.S., among many more.

References 

Neurogenetic disorders
Syndromes with intellectual disability
Rare genetic syndromes